The Lowell Creek Diversion Tunnel is a flood control project located in Seward, Alaska, United States. The project was constructed to alleviate flooding of Lowell Creek in Seward. It was the first flood control project completed by the United States Army Corps of Engineers in Alaska.

Originally, Lowell Creek ran through Seward along what is now Jefferson Street. Beginning with the town's establishment in 1903, the fast-moving stream produced one to three severe floods a year until the tunnel was built in 1939. The floods carried large amounts of debris from the mountains; one flood deposited 10,000 cubic yards in an 11-hour period in 1935.

In 1927 the Alaska Railroad constructed a small diversion dam and flume to carry debris down Jefferson Street to drain into Resurrection Bay. However, by 1937 these structures had deteriorated beyond repair. Consequently, the Army Corps of Engineers began construction of the new project in August 1939. The project consisted of: 

Completed in 1940, this system withstood the 1964 Alaska earthquake, as well as severe floods in 1966, 1986, and 1995, which brought the water level within inches of cresting the dam.

The tunnel was listed on the National Register of Historic Places in 1977. 

Though the project has prevented significant flooding of the city of Seward, debris continues to accumulate at the outlet of the flume and the city must work to move the debris further into the bay. With the significant risk of debris accumulation during a flooding event, new projects are being considered to replace the diversion tunnel — including construction of a new, wider tunnel through Bear Mountain at a cost of $30 million, or an aqueduct underneath Jefferson Street.

See also
National Register of Historic Places listings in Kenai Peninsula Borough, Alaska

References

1940 establishments in Alaska
Transportation buildings and structures on the National Register of Historic Places in Alaska
Buildings and structures in Seward, Alaska
Tunnels completed in 1940
Water tunnels on the National Register of Historic Places
Buildings and structures on the National Register of Historic Places in Kenai Peninsula Borough, Alaska